Tore "Turbo" Lennartsson, (born November 29, 1952) is a Swedish former footballer. He was known as a fast runner and scorer. He was playing in the team of Gefle IF that advanced to the Swedish premier league Allsvenskan in 1982.

Lennartsson managed Sandvikens IF and now works as a sport teacher in Gävle and as an instructor at Gästrikland's football federation.

Clubs
Skoglunds IF, the parent club
Örebro SK, 1972–1981
Gefle IF, 1982–84

References

Living people
1952 births
Swedish footballers
Association football forwards
Allsvenskan players
Gefle IF players
Örebro SK players
Swedish football managers
Sandvikens IF managers